Oleg Sudakov (4 May 1962), better known as Manager is a Russian musician, poet, artist, and publicist.
He is also cofounder of band Kommunizm (with Yegor Letov and Konstantin Ryabinov). From 2002 to 2005 Sudakov was leader of  the branch of the National Bolshevik Party in Novosibirsk.

Discography 

Anarkhiya
 1988 — Паралич

Grazhdanskaya Oborona
 1988 — Свет и стулья (live in Novosibirsk, released in 2001)

Armiya Vlasova
 1989 — Армия Власова

Kommunizm
 1988 — На советской скорости 
 1988 — Сулейман Стальский 
 1989 — Родина слышит 
 1989 — Солдатский сон

Rodina
 1994 — Русский прорыв в Киеве 
 1994 — Русский прорыв в Москве 
 1995 — Быть живым 
 2002 — Тот свет 
 2004 — Колесница звёзд 
 2008 — Добровольный Эдем 
 2014 — На блаженном острове коммунизма

Tsyganyata i Ya s Ilyicha
 1989 - Гаубицы лейтенанта Гурубы
 1990 - Арджуна-драйв

External links

1962 births
Russian punk rock musicians
Russian rock singers
Musicians from Novosibirsk
National Bolshevik Party politicians
20th-century Russian male singers
20th-century Russian singers
Living people